Volodymyr Vasylkovych (died 1289) was a son of Vasylko Romanovych, prince of Volhynia, now part of Ukraine. He succeeded his father when the latter died in 1269, and was famous for numerous constructions and reconstructions of town fortifications in Volhynia.

In the 1270s (1276, according to most sources) he founded a castle that included a keep now famous as the Tower of Kamyanets, and around which sprang up the town of Kamyanets, now in Belarus; he also authored the construction of a similar tower in the re-built castle of Berestye (modern Brest, Belarus). He died in 1289 in Luboml (or Liuboml), which is now in Ukraine. Summing up his life, the "old chronicle" presented him as a booklover and philosopher, whose like in the world had never before been seen, and would never be seen again.

Vasylkovych was renowned for his favorable treatment of the region's Jewish population, which had erewhile been severely maligned and ill-treated. According to an annalist who describes the funeral of the grand duke Volodymyr Vasylkovych in the city of Volodymyr, "the Jews wept at his funeral as at the fall of Jerusalem, or when being led into the Babylonian captivity."

References

Rurikids
1289 deaths
Year of birth unknown
Princes of Volhynia